Ong Ka Chuan (born 29 May 1954) is a Malaysian politician and was the Member of Parliament for Tanjung Malim, Perak from March 2008 to May 2018. Ong was the secretary-general for twice for the Malaysian Chinese Association (MCA), a component party of the Barisan Nasional coalition. The first time he was elected by the 7th MCA President Ong Ka Ting who is also his younger brother on 30 August 2005 and the second time by the 10th MCA President Liow Tiong Lai on 2 January 2014.

Ong was the Second Minister for International Trade and Industry from 2015 to 2018. Formerly he was the Minister of Housing and Local Government from 2008 to 2009.

Early and personal life
Ong was born on 29 May 1954 in Lenggong, Perak. He graduated from the University of Malaya (UM) and worked as a school teacher before entering politics. He is married to Chan Beng Choo and the couple has two children.

MCA former President Ong Ka Ting, is his younger brother.

Political career
Ong was a member of the Perak State Assembly for Chenderiang for four terms from 1986 to 2004, before contesting the federal seat of Batu Gajah in the 2004 general election. He lost to Fong Poh Kuan of the Democratic Action Party (DAP), despite the Barisan Nasional coalition making widespread gains nationwide. Despite this, he was appointed MCA secretary-general the following year and served concurrently with his brother Ong Ka Ting as president.

In the 2008 general elections, Ong contested and won the Tanjung Malim parliamentary seat. He was appointed Minister of Housing and Local Government. Later that year, Ong contested the MCA deputy presidency but lost to Chua Soi Lek, and was immediately removed as secretary-general by new president Ong Tee Keat. In 2009, he was dropped from the Cabinet by incoming Prime Minister Najib Razak.

In the 2013 general elections, Ong successfully defended his parliamentary seat despite MCA suffered its worst electoral result in its history. As a result of MCA poor performance and its previously passed resolution not to take up cabinet posts in the government if it failed in the 13th general election, MCA will not take up any government position. Later in 2013, MCA elected Liow Tiong Lai as the new president and reversed its resolution. Liow appointed Ong as new MCA secretary-general for the second time then. In 2015, Najib Razak in a cabinet reshuffle eventually appointed Ong as the Second Minister for International Trade and Industry.

He was dropped as a candidate for the Tanjong Malim constituency in the 2018 election.

Election results

Honours
 Malaysia:
  Commander of the Order of Loyalty to the Crown of Malaysia (PSM) – Tan Sri (2022)
 Perak:
 Commander of the Order of the Perak State Crown (PMP) (1987)
 Knight Commander of the Order of the Perak State Crown (DPMP) – Dato' (1990)
 Knight Grand Commander of the Order of the Perak State Crown (SPMP) – Dato' Seri (2008)

References

 

Living people
1954 births
People from Perak
Commanders of the Order of Loyalty to the Crown of Malaysia
Malaysian people of Hokkien descent
Malaysian people of Chinese descent
Malaysian Buddhists
Malaysian politicians of Chinese descent
Malaysian Chinese Association politicians
Members of the Dewan Rakyat
Government ministers of Malaysia
Members of the Perak State Legislative Assembly
University of Malaya alumni
21st-century Malaysian politicians